Kaithu is one of the main localities of Shimla city, in Himachal Pradesh, India. It is near Annadale. The area of Kaithu is highly posh and populated.

Geography

Kaithu is located near Annadale and Cart Road area of Shimla and is one of the major suburbs of Shimla. It is located near 1.5 km an away from Old Bus Stand and same from Shimla Railway Station. It comes under Shimla Municipal Corporation's Ward No. 4. Annadale is its close area to hangout. A Gurudwara is also situated here in Chungi Khana area.

Kaithu is divided into two areas, Upper Kaithu and Lower Kaithu. While Lower Kaithu has the primary health centre, Upper Kaithu has the City Police Lines, Public Works Department colonies along with a temple and a High Court Guest House. Kaithu has three municipal corporation parkings two near Gol Pahadi and one near Police Lines. Kaithu's area has spread from the Circular Road near Pine View Hotel, below Fingask Estate to Chungi Khana, above Gol Pahadi.

Education

Kaithu has a convent school, Loreto Covent Tara Hall, two public schools, Grammar Public School and Himalayan Public School. In addition, it has three government schools, Kaithu High School, other two are in Buchail and Chungi Khana areas.

References

Shimla